Il ficcanaso (The Nosy One) is a 1981 Italian giallo-comedy film directed by Bruno Corbucci.

Plot 
Luciano Persichetti is haunted by a mysterious killer who calls himself "The Guardian Angel" with precognitive abilities.

Cast 

 Pippo Franco: Luciano Persichetti
 Edwige Fenech: Susanna Luisetti
 Pino Caruso: Inspector
 Laura Troschel: Carla Foscari
 Luc Merenda: Paolo
 Sergio Leonardi: Lino

See also   
 List of Italian films of 1981

References

External links
 

1981 films
1981 comedy films
1980s comedy mystery films
1980s Italian-language films
Films directed by Bruno Corbucci
Films scored by Franco Micalizzi
Giallo films
Italian comedy mystery films
1980s Italian films